"Bebo" (English: "I Drink") is a song by American singer Romeo Santos. It is the fourth single for Santos' fifth studio album Formula, Vol. 3 (2022). Santos had posted a video on social media teasing the single on August 22, 2022. Some thought it was going to be the second single for the album. Eventually the music video was released on September 9, 2022. This was a week after the released of 2 other singles and the album itself, which makes it the fourth single.

Charts

Certifications

References

2022 singles
2022 songs
Romeo Santos songs
Sony Music Latin singles
Songs written by Romeo Santos
Bachata songs
Spanish-language songs